Kopito Ridge (‘Rid Kopito’ \'rid ko-'pi-to\) is the mostly ice-free ridge in the southeast foothills of Detroit Plateau on southern Trinity Peninsula in Graham Land, Antarctica, which is bounded by Boydell Glacier to the west and Zavera Snowfield to the east.  It extends 6 km in northwest-southeast direction and 2.7 km wide, and rises to 1014 m in its northwest part which is linked to Detroit Plateau east of Lobosh Buttress.

The ridge is named after the peaks of Golyamo (Great) Kopito and Malko (Little) Kopito in Vitosha Mountain, Western Bulgaria.

Location

Maps
 Antarctic Digital Database (ADD). Scale 1:250000 topographic map of Antarctica. Scientific Committee on Antarctic Research (SCAR). Since 1993, regularly upgraded and updated.

Notes

References
 Kopito Ridge. SCAR Composite Antarctic Gazetteer.
 Bulgarian Antarctic Gazetteer. Antarctic Place-names Commission. (details in Bulgarian, basic data in English)

Ridges of Graham Land
Landforms of Trinity Peninsula
Bulgaria and the Antarctic